, stylized as Gal★Gun, is a Japanese bishōjo rail shooter game developed by Inti Creates and published by Alchemist. It was first released on Xbox 360 in 2011, followed by a PlayStation 3 port a year later. The game takes place in a fictional academy in Japan, where the player takes the role of a male student, Tenzou Motesugi. He must shoot his female classmates, who are running desperately after him, with "Pheromone Arrows" to prevent them from making their partner, while he finds one of the four lead girls before sunset.

A remastered version, titled , was released in Japan and Asia for Nintendo Switch on January 28, 2021, and in North America and Europe on February 12. A Microsoft Windows version was also released worldwide on the same date.

Gameplay

Gal Gun is a rail shooter and bishōjo game. Player controls the protagonist, Tenzou, to shoot his female classmates with "Pheromone Arrow", while he moves automatically through predetermined route on each stage. The player may use the analogue stick or mouse to move the reticle on the screen. Girls runs towards the player trying to profess their love via notes or screams that must be prevented by shooting them. If player fails to do so, this results in damage to his HP. The girls who've been shot receive euphoria, subduing them in process. Each girl has their own weak point in their body that results in "Ecstasy Shot", subduing them immediately if shot. As the game progresses through each stage, the player may confront female teachers that must be shot multiple times, making them harder to subdue.

If the player subdues enough girls, the Heart Gauge fills up, which enables option to initiate "Doki Doki Mode", by aiming on a girl and pressing the button. During Doki Doki Mode, the player needs to fill in "Doki Doki Gauge" within time limit by zooming in and shooting at selected part on the girl. More sensitive part of the girl will fill the gauge faster, but the girl will block the part quickly. When the gauge is full, the player can give her euphoria, and "Doki Doki Bomb" will subdue all the other girls on the screen. Tenzou's stats also changes depending on the selected girl.

The game has dating sim-based Story Mode, where player might be asked to answer the questions from the main characters. Player's answer affects the main girl's love interest on Tenzou, which affects the story progression and the ending.

During Story Mode "Action Events" may occur, which can be either a mini-game or boss battle. Player's performance during such events will also affect the progression towards the ending.

The developer also added a panic button that switches the action for a retro-looking game, with authentic animations and sounds. This is referred to as a Mama kita gamen or "Mom arrived screen".

In the original Xbox 360 version, the player could control the camera below the hemline of the girl during Doki Doki Mode. However, Microsoft ordered the game publisher, Alchemist, to eliminate this feature by releasing "Panties Protect Patch" [sic] update on March 18, 2011. This change only affects the Xbox 360 version, and therefore doesn't affect subsequent releases on other platforms.

Synopsis
The game takes place in a fictional academy, named Sakurazaki Academy. The apprentice cupid angel, named Patako, must shoot an assigned person with a so-called "Pheromone Arrow" in order to graduate. Patako targets the protagonist Tenzou Motesugi, a second-year male student, with her crossbow, in hope of getting a girlfriend when shot with an arrow, as she claimed he has no experience with the girls. However, she accidentally shoots Tenzou with sixteen arrows instead of one, as it was somehow set to full-automatic "overkill" firing mode without her knowledge.

The aura effect created by multiple shots causes him to attract female students from the entire school, trying to confess their love of him, and they desperately run after him trying to make him their partner. This effect only lasts for a single day of his life. Patako refers him as "Way Too Freakin' Popular" ("WTFP").

An unintended major consequence he would face after being shot with multiple arrows is if he is unable to find a girlfriend before the sunset, he will be destined for a life of loneliness.

The player can choose one of four main "True Love" girls. Each has different route, and features different endings, as well depending on player's progression.

Release 
Gal Gun was originally released on the Xbox 360 in Japan on January 27, 2011. A PlayStation 3 port with additional characters and PlayStation Move support was released on February 23, 2012.

To commemorate the original release's 10th anniversary, a remastered version, titled Gal Gun Returns, was released in Japan and Asia for Nintendo Switch on January 28, 2021. Unlike the original title, Gal Gun Returns is localized. It was released in North America and Europe on February 12, alongside the Microsoft Windows version for all regions. An Xbox One version of the game was initially planned for release alongside both systems, but was later cancelled.

Reception

Gal Gun Returns received mixed reception from critics, currently holding a 68 on review aggregator Metacritic for the Switch version.

Legacy
A sequel, Gal Gun: Double Peace, was released in Japan for PlayStation 4 and PlayStation Vita on August 6, 2015.  Noting the praise of the first game received from players outside Japan, Inti Creates released Double Peace on July 22, 2016 in Europe and August 2 in North America, making the first game in the series being released worldwide. 

On February 23, 2023, Inti Creates would release Gal Guardians: Demon Purge for the Nintendo Switch, Playstation 4, Playstation 5, Xbox Series X/S, Xbox One, and Steam as a spinoff of Double Peace, which stars sisters Shinobu and Maya Kamizono, protaganists from Gal*Gun: Double Peace and Gal*Gun 2, as they discover a castle filled with demons that suddenly appears at Sakurazaki Academy with their job being to demon hunter duo to solve the mystery of what happened to the school and its students. The game also features Kurona, a mischievous demon girl and antagonist from the same two games, challenging the sisters. The game is a 2D action platformer with heavy inspiration from Castlevania in which players explore the castle, finding secrets, battling enemies and bosses, and obtaining items to advance the story and access new areas.

A virtual reality (VR) game, Gal Gun VR, was released worldwide for PC on August 9, 2017 via Steam.

A fourth game in the series, titled Gal Gun 2, was released in Japan on March 15, 2018 for the Nintendo Switch and PlayStation 4 and a PC port was released on July 20 via Steam. The Japanese version was published by Inti Creates, whilst the North American and European release were handled by PQube Games.

Mighty Gunvolt, an 8-bit styled spin-off of Inti Creates' other title, Azure Striker Gunvolt, features Ekoro from Gal Gun as a playable character. The game was originally released for the Nintendo 3DS in August 2014, while a PlayStation 4 and Vita port, titled Gal Gunvolt, was released on August 6, 2015 to coincide with the release of Double Peace.

Notes

References

External links
Alchemist official website 
Xbox page 
PlayStation page 
Gal Gun Returns official English website

2011 video games
Inti Creates games
Bishōjo games
Harem video games
PlayStation 3 games
PlayStation Move-compatible games
Light gun games
Rail shooters
Video games developed in Japan
Video games scored by Ippo Yamada
Xbox 360 games
Obscenity controversies in video games
Single-player video games
Nintendo Switch games
Cancelled Xbox One games
Windows games
PQube games
Alchemist (company) games